Villar is a Spanish surname. Notable people with the surname include:

Adrián Villar Rojas (born 1980), Argentine sculptor 
Alberto Villar (died 1974), Argentine police chief and co-founder of Argentine Anticommunist Alliance
Amarilis Villar (born 1984), Venezuelan volleyball player
Ángel Villar (born 1949), Spanish sprint canoer
Ángel María Villar (born 1950), Spanish footballer
Antonio Villaraigosa (born Antonio Villar), former mayor of Los Angeles 
Buboy Villar (born 1999), Filipino actor
César Martín Villar (born 1977), Spanish footballer
Cynthia Villar (born 1950), Filipino politician
David Villar (born 1997), American baseball player for the San Francisco Giants 
Diego Villar (born 1981), Argentine footballer
Diego Mariño Villar (born 1990), Spanish footballer
Federico Villar (born 1985), Argentine footballer
Felipe Mena Villar, Chilean agricultural engineer
Gabriel Villar (1748–1826), Spanish clergyman and politician
Germán Villar (born 1975), Spanish opera singer
Gonzalo Villar (poet) (born 1968), Chilean poet
Henry Villar (born 1987), Dominican Republic baseball player
Jesús Blanco Villar (born 1963), Spanish cyclist
Jonathan Villar (born 1991), Dominican baseball player
Juan Villar (born 1988), Spanish footballer
Justo Villar (born 1977), Paraguayan footballer
León Villar (born 1969), Spanish judoka
Leonardo Villar (1923–2020), Brazilian actor
Luis Villar (born 1967), Argentine basketball player
Luis Villar Borda (1929-2008), Colombian politician and jurist 
Manny Villar (born 1949), Filipino businessman and politician
Mark Villar (born 1978), Filipino businessman and politician
Paulo Villar (born 1978), Colombian hurdler
Ricardo Villar (Argentine footballer) (born 1989), Argentine footballer
Ricardo Villar (Brazilian footballer) (born 1979), Brazilian footballer
Rusmeris Villar (born 1983), Colombian weightlifter
Samanta Villar (born 1975), Spanish journalist
Sergio Villar (born 1944), Uruguayan footballer
Wilmar Villar Mendoza (born c. 1980), Cuban dissident

See also
Vilar (surname), a similarly spelled surname
Villard (surname), a similarly spelled surname
Villari (surname), a similarly spelled surname

Spanish-language surnames